Songshan District is a district of Taipei, Taiwan. The Songshan Airport and the Taipei Arena are located here.

History
Songshan was originally named Malysyakkaw, a lowland Ketagalan word meaning "Where the river twists". Its written form was abbreviated in 1815 during Qing rule.

During Japanese rule (1895-1945), the area served as a prime tea-growing area in northern Taiwan. The village, named after Matsuyama City in Japan, was incorporated into Taihoku City (modern-day Taipei) in 1938.

At the outset of one-party rule by the Kuomintang (1945-1990), the Mandarin Chinese reading of the kanji characters  (i.e. Sung-shan) was adopted as the name of the district, which in 1946 officially comprised 26 municipal villages. In 1949, the area's tea estates gave way to military housing for lower-income Kuomintang refugee families. The bodies of many residents and political victims from Taiwan's martial law period are buried in hillside cemeteries that now overlook the Taipei 101 shopping district. By 1980, Songshan was the most populous area of the city.

In 1990, the southern half of Songshan District became Xinyi District while the northern half retained its original name. The boundary of this smaller Songshan District was altered in May 1994 when the course of Keelung River was moved slightly to the south.

Administrative divisions

Songshan is divided into four regions, or secondary district, which in turn are divided into 33 municipal villages.

Government institutions
 Institute of Transportation

Institutions
 Construction and Planning Agency
 Japan–Taiwan Exchange Association
 Belgian Office, Taipei
 Liaison Office of the Republic of South Africa
 Malaysian Friendship and Trade Centre
 Manila Economic and Cultural Office

Economy

The district is a major financial center in Taipei, with many banking institutions located on Dunhua North Road and Nanjing East Road.

Mandarin Airlines, Daily Air and Far Eastern Air Transport have their headquarters in Songshan.

Before moving its headquarters to a new location at CAL Park, Taoyuan International Airport, China Airlines formerly had its headquarters in the location of its current Taipei Branch Office on Nanjing E. Rd. After the headquarters move, China Airlines developed part of the training center at Taipei Songshan Airport into a business aviation center.

Infrastructures
 Taiwan Adventist Hospital

Education
 National Open University — Taipei Learning Center
 Sungshan Community College: located within Zhonglun Senior High School, in Jixiang Village 
 Taipei Municipal Zhonglun High School
 Taipei Municipal Xisong High School
 Yu Da High School of Commerce and Home Economics (short ): a private vocational high school in Meiren Village 
In addition, there are six middle schools, and eight elementary schools

Tourist attractions

 Breeze Center
 Ciyou Temple
 Puppetry Art Center of Taipei
 Raohe Street Night Market, organized in 1987, contains over 160 booths.
 Songshan Xiahai Chenghuang Temple was built in 1753.
 Taipei-Fu Chenghuang Temple was built in 1926.
 Fo Guang Shan Pumen Temple is the Taipei branch monastery of Fo Guang Shan Order.
 Taipei Arena is a modern facility that hosts events ranging from sports to concerts.
 Taipei Gymnasium
 The Metropolitan Hall is a venue for music, dancing, and theatrical performances operated by Taipei City Arts Promotion Office
 Land Reform Museum
 Aurora Art Museum
 Taiwan Stock Museum
 Yingfeng Riverside Park
 Guanshan Riverside Park
 Sanmin Park
 Xinzhong Park
 Japanese Cultural Center

Transportation

Roads
Fuxing North Road runs along the western boundary of the district. The other major north-south road is Dunhua North Road. Several major east-west arteries include Minquan East Road, Sec. 3-5; Minsheng East Road, Sec. 3-5; Nanjing East Road, Sec. 3-5; and  Bade Road, Sec. 2-4.

The southern border is outlined by the Civic Blvd. Meanwhile, National Highway 1 borders the northern part of the district.

Metro
The Taipei Metro serves the district via the following stations:
Zhongshan Junior High School metro station
Songshan Airport metro station
Taipei Arena metro station
Nanjing Sanmin metro station
Songshan station
Nanjing Fuxing metro station

Airport
Songshan Airport is located in Dongshe Region, accessible by the Taipei Metro Wenhu line's Songshan Airport metro station.

Notable natives
 Ying Wei-min, actor and singer

See also

 District (Taiwan)

References

External links

  
 Map of the Songshan District from Taiwan's Ministry of the Interior

Districts of Taipei